Clayton Township may refer to the following places in the United States:

 Clayton Township, Adams County, Illinois
 Clayton Township, Woodford County, Illinois
 Clayton Township, Clayton County, Iowa
 Clayton Township, Taylor County, Iowa
 Clayton Township, Arenac County, Michigan
 Clayton Township, Genesee County, Michigan
 Clayton Township, Minnesota
 Clayton, Gloucester County, New Jersey
 Clayton Township, Perry County, Ohio

Township name disambiguation pages